is a town located in Tamana District, Kumamoto Prefecture, Japan.

As of March 2017, the town has an estimated population of 16,125 and the density of 830 persons per km². The total area is 19.43 km².

References

External links 

Nagasu official website 

Towns in Kumamoto Prefecture